Abdula Abdulzhalilov (born 25 October 1990) is a Russian judoka. He is the gold medallist in the -66 kg at the 2017 Judo Grand Prix Antalya

References

External links
 

1990 births
Living people
Russian male judoka
Universiade medalists in judo
Universiade silver medalists for Russia
Universiade bronze medalists for Russia
Medalists at the 2017 Summer Universiade
21st-century Russian people